Bible museum may refer to any of the following museums:
Bible Lands Museum in Jerusalem
Bible Museum Münster in Münster, Germany
Bible and Orient Museum in Fribourg, Switzerland
Bijbels Museum in Amsterdam
Ernst Glück Bible Museum in Alūksne, Latvia
Museum of the Bible in Washington, DC
Nordic Bible Museum in Oslo, Norway
Shrine of the Book, Israel Museum, Jerusalem